The World Conker Championships (WCC) is a conkers tournament held annually on the second Sunday in October in the county of Northamptonshire, England. Two players use conkers threaded onto a string and take turns to strike the other's nut until it shatters. Players from around the world enter the tournament, competing in a knock-out format in both team and individual formats, with titles for men's, women's and youth categories.  Up to 5,000 spectators watch around 400 players participating. from many countries, including Australia, Austria, Canada, France, Japan, Mexico, New Zealand, Poland, Russia, South Africa, Sri Lanka, Ukraine, the United States and the United Kingdom.

WCC History

The World Conker Championships began in 1965 when a group of anglers in Ashton held a conker contest at the Chequered Skipper public house because the weather was too bad to go fishing. At the event, a small collection was made for charity, by a person with a blind relative. Since then the event has raised over £420,000 for charities supporting the visually impaired and at least £2,5000 is donated yearly. The event was held in Ashton for 45 years before moving to a larger venue at the Shuckburgh Arms in Southwick, Northamptonshire in 2009.

The tournament has been threatened with conker shortages over the years, in 1976 conkers used in the tournament had to be flown in from Jersey, in 1980 freak spring weather was one of the factors that threatened the World Conker Championships causing a conker shortage, and in 1982 a late frost killed off the horse chestnut blossom resulting in a failed conker harvest.
 
On Thursday 6 October 2011, organisers were forced to cancel the event over safety fears with high winds being forecasted. 
In 2012, the championships were cancelled again when a suitable venue couldn't be found in time.

Concerns for the future of the event were voiced over the Horse-chestnut leaf miner moth, Cameraria ohridella, which has appeared in the region and could have a detrimental effect on the UK's Horse-chestnut population affecting conker yields.

On 9 October 2017, Chelsea pensioner John Riley won the men's tournament at the age of 85, quite possibly making him the oldest world champion on the planet.

In 2022,  Fee Aylmore won the women's event after 30 years of trying.

WCC Rules

Players' Rules of Engagement for the Noble Game of Conkers as follows:
Prior to the game, over 2,000 conkers (horse chestnuts) of the required 1.25-inch (30 mm) width are collected, drilled and strung ready by tournament officials. All conkers and laces are supplied by the World Conker Championships.
 Conkers are drawn ‘blind’ from a bag, and players may reject up to three selected conkers.
 Each game will commence with a toss of a coin, the winner of the toss may elect to strike or receive.
 A distance of no less than 8" or 20 cm of lace must be between knuckle and nut.
 Each player then takes three alternate strikes at the opponent's conker.
 Each attempted strike must be clearly aimed at the nut, no deliberate miss hits.
 The game will be decided once one of the conkers is smashed.
 A small piece of nut or skin remaining (less than a third) shall be judged out, it must be enough to mount an attack.
 If both nuts smash at the same time then the match shall be replayed.
 Any nut being knocked from the lace but not smashing may be re threaded and the game continued.
 A player causing a knotting of the laces (a snag) will be noted, three snags will lead to disqualification.
 If a game lasts for more than five minutes then play will halt and the "5-minute rule" will come into effect. Each player will be allowed up to nine further strikes at their opponent's nut, again alternating three strikes each. If neither conker has been smashed at the end of the nine strikes then the player who strikes the nut the most times during this period will be judged the winner. If this is equal, then play continues, one strike each in turn, until one player hits and the other misses.

WCC Results history

All players are British except where indicated with a national flag icon.

WCC Roll of Honour
Shown in alphabetical order by surname in the event of a tie.

WCC Video History from 1974 to 2021
 2021 World Conker Championship courtesy of Britclip
 2017 World Conker Championship by thevideoclipplace on Youtube
 2016 World Conker Championship by BBC Northampton on Youtube
 2015 World Conker Championship by Trans World Sport on Youtube
 2014 World Conker Championship courtesy of Youtube
 2010 World Conker Championship by Ben Moseby
 1974 World Conker Championship by ITV on Youtube

References

Sport in Northamptonshire
Annual events in the United Kingdom
Recurring sporting events established in 1965
1965 establishments in England
Conker
Autumn traditions